Malone is an unincorporated community and census-designated place (CDP) in Grays Harbor County, Washington, United States. The population was 475 at the 2010 census. Prior to 2010 it was part of the Malone-Porter CDP; Malone and Porter are now separate CDPs. They are located just off U.S. Route 12, southeast of Elma and northwest of Oakville, and along a shortline that is part of the Puget Sound and Pacific Railroad.

Geography
Malone is located in southeastern Grays Harbor County, east of the Chehalis River valley. It is bordered to the southeast by the Porter CDP and to the southwest by U.S. Route 12, which leads west  to Aberdeen and southeast  to Grand Mound and Interstate 5.

Malone is the home of Red's Hop N' Market, a mini-mart that is also the U.S. Postal Service's (USPS) first official village post office, a post office located within an existing retail establishment, with limited service and no full-time postmaster. The mini-mart's owner is paid $2,000/year by the US Postal Service to sell stamps and shipping supplies and allow the USPS to place mailboxes on-site.

References

Census-designated places in Grays Harbor County, Washington
Census-designated places in Washington (state)